Stonk,  STONK or Stonks may refer to:

"The Stonk", a 1991 novelty song by Hale & Pace
 STONK, the codename for a rifle in the novel The Eyre Affair by Jasper Fforde
 Stonk!, a 2009 album by Welsh band Derwyddon Dr Gonzo
 Stonks, a character from The Borrible Trilogy series of novels by Michael de Larrabeiti
 Stonks, an internet meme featuring Meme Man used to parody the stock market